Pietro Ferrero (born April 23, 1905 in Turin) was an Italian professional football player.

Honours
 Serie A champion: 1930/31, 1931/32, 1932/33, 1933/34.

1905 births
Year of death missing
Italian footballers
Serie A players
Juventus F.C. players
U.C. Sampdoria players
Association football defenders